The Muskwa-Slave Lake forests ecoregion (WWF ID: NA0610) covers Canadian taiga in northwestern Alberta, northeastern British Columbia and a large portion of the southwestern Northwest Territories around the Mackenzie River valley and the Great Slave Lake.

Setting
The ecoregion's specific areas include the boreal forest to the east of the MacKenzie (between Mackenzie and Franklin Mountains; the land along the Horn River west to the Mackenzie; the Liard River basin; and the Caribou Mountains in north-central Alberta.  

The landscape consists of wide, flat plains and lowlands broken by low mountains and plateaus, such as the Caribou Mountains. Almost half of the area is covered in wetlands and bogs such as Zama Lake in Alberta.

Flora
Vegetation consists mainly of dense forests of trembling aspen (Populus tremuloides), white spruce (Picea glauca) and balsam fir (Abies balsamea), with smaller populations of balsam poplar (Populus balsamifera), black spruce (Picea mariana) and birch.

Fauna
This ecoregion is rich in wildlife including large herds (numbering in the thousands) of Migratory Woodland Caribou (Rangifer tarandus caribou) and other large mammals such as moose (Alces alces), Wood Bison (Bison bison athabascae) (Wood Buffalo National Park is in this region), elk (Cervus canadensis) and mule deer (Odocoileus hemonius) along with smaller animals such as snowshoe hare (Lepus americanus). The predators that feed on all this wildlife include Canada Lynx (Lynx canadensis), grizzly bear (Ursos arctos horriblus), American black bear (Ursus americanus), red fox (Vulpes vulpes), and gray wolf (Canis lupus). Birds include the waterfowl of the many wetlands along with prairie birds such as grouse.

Threats and preservation
This ecoregion is well preserved, with an estimated 75% intact. Protected areas include western parts of Wood Buffalo National Park in Northern Alberta the south-central Northwest Territories, and Maxhamish Lake Provincial Park and Protected Area in northeastern British Columbia. Logging is the greatest threat to the region's ecological integrity along with potential for mining, the effect of the Mackenzie Highway and oil pipelines.

See also
 List of ecoregions in Canada (WWF)

References

Taiga and boreal forests
Forests of Alberta
Nearctic ecoregions
Ecozones and ecoregions of British Columbia
Ecozones and ecoregions of Alberta
Ecozones and ecoregions of the Northwest Territories
Forests of British Columbia